Little Horkesley is a civil parish in the county of Essex, England and is situated approximately 4 miles north of Colchester on the south bank of the River Stour. 
In the time of Elizabeth I, the manor of Little Horkesley belonged to the Wentworth family, a branch of the notable Yorkshire family who became Earl of Stafford, and then passed by inheritance to a branch of the St. Lawrence family who had the title Baron and later Earl of Howth.

References

External links

 Victoria County History A History of the County of South Suffolk: Volume 10 - Lexden Hundred (Part) including Dedham, Earls Colne and Wivenhoe

Borough of Colchester
Villages in Essex